In mathematics, specifically in the field of topology, a monotonically normal space is a particular kind of normal space, defined in terms of a monotone normality operator.  It satisfies some interesting properties; for example metric spaces and linearly ordered spaces are monotonically normal, and every monotonically normal space is hereditarily normal.

Definition

A topological space  is called monotonically normal if it satisfies any of the following equivalent definitions:

Definition 1

The space  is T1 and there is a function  that assigns to each ordered pair  of disjoint closed sets in  an open set  such that:
(i) ;

Condition (i) says  is a normal space, as witnessed by the function .  
Condition (ii) says that  varies in a monotone fashion, hence the terminology monotonically normal.
The operator  is called a monotone normality operator.

One can always choose  to satisfy the property
,

Definition 2

Definition 3

(i) ;

Such a function  automatically satisfies
.
(Reason: Suppose . Since  is T1, there is an open neighborhood  of  such that . So .)

Definition 4

Definition 5

(i) ;

Such a function  automatically satisfies all conditions of Definition 3.

Examples

 Every metrizable space is monotonically normal.
 Every linearly ordered topological space (LOTS) is monotonically normal.  This is assuming the Axiom of Choice, as without it there are examples of LOTS that are not even normal.
 The Sorgenfrey line is monotonically normal. Alternatively, the Sorgenfrey line is monotonically normal because it can be embedded as a subspace of a LOTS, namely the double arrow space.
 Any generalised metric is monotonically normal.

Properties

 Monotone normality is a hereditary property: Every subspace of a monotonically normal space is monotonically normal.
 Every monotonically normal space is completely normal Hausdorff (or T5).
 Every monotonically normal space is hereditarily collectionwise normal.
 The image of a monotonically normal space under a continuous closed map is monotonically normal.
 A compact Hausdorff space  is the continuous image of a compact linearly ordered space if and only if  is monotonically normal.

References

Properties of topological spaces